Hugh Raphael McMullen (December 16, 1901 – May 23, 1986) was a  Major League Baseball catcher.

External links

1901 births
1986 deaths
New York Giants (NL) players
Cincinnati Reds players
Washington Senators (1901–1960) players
Baseball players from Kansas
People from La Cygne, Kansas